Hnonae is a town in the Mandalay Division of Myanmar, located approximately 100 km north of Mandalay.

References

Populated places in Mandalay Region
Mandalay Region